Tent Peak is a tent-shaped peak rising to about  midway between Mount Terror and Cape Crozier in eastern Ross Island, near Antarctica. Descriptively named by a party of the New Zealand Geological Survey Antarctic Expedition (NZGSAE), 1958–59, which occupied the peak as an astronomical control station, January5, 1959, and erected a tent below the peak.

Mountains of Ross Island